Group B of the 2013 Fed Cup Asia/Oceania Zone Group II was one of two pools in the Asia/Oceania zone of the 2013 Fed Cup. Five teams competed in a round robin competition, with the teams proceeding to their respective sections of the play-offs: the top team played for advancement to the 2014 Group I.

Standings

Round robin

Philippines vs. Indonesia

Kyrgyzstan vs. Pakistan

Malaysia vs. Iran

Philippines vs. Iran

Indonesia vs. Pakistan

Kyrgyzstan vs. Malaysia

Philippines vs. Malaysia

Indonesia vs. Kyrgyzstan

Pakistan vs. Iran

Philippines vs. Pakistan

Indonesia vs. Malaysia

Kyrgyzstan vs. Iran

Philippines vs. Kyrgyzstan

Indonesia vs. Iran

Pakistan vs. Malaysia

References

External links
 Fed Cup website

2013 Fed Cup Asia/Oceania Zone